Tear Down These Walls is the seventh studio album by British recording artist Billy Ocean, released in February 1988 by Jive Records and Arista Records as the follow-up to Ocean's critically and commercially successful 1986 album Love Zone.

Background
The album's title is a reference to then-President Ronald Reagan's "tear down this wall!" speech. It features guest backing vocals from artists including the Manhattans, Will Downing, Carroll Thompson, and Mary Cassidy, and is generally regarded as the culmination of the smoother, more adult-oriented sound of Ocean's later work.

One of Ocean's most commercially successful studio albums, it went on to peak at #3 on the UK Albums Chart and reached #18 on the US Billboard 200. The album launched four charting singles in the UK: "Get Outta My Dreams, Get into My Car"  peaked at #3 on the UK Singles Chart; "Calypso Crazy" peaked at #35; "The Colour of Love" at #65 and "Stand and Deliver" at #97.

"Get Outta My Dreams, Get into My Car" was Ocean's third and final #1 hit on the Billboard Hot 100 chart, and his fourth and final #1 R&B hit in that country. The song topped pop charts in several other countries, including Australia, Belgium, Canada, Ireland, the Netherlands, and Norway. "The Colour of Love" was a top 20 pop hit in the US and Canada, and Ocean's tenth and final top-10 hit on the US R&B chart.

Tear Down These Walls was released in 39 versions, including a unique Mini CD version (three 3" CDs) for the UK.

The album was re-released on 16 June 2014 on Cherry Pop featuring rare bonus content. The reissue is a 2-CD set with the original album digitally remastered from the original 1/2" mix tapes; the bonus content consists of associated 7", and 12" mixes.

Critical reception
On release, the album received generally favourable reviews by music critics. In a retrospective review for AllMusic, critic Ron Wynn gave the album three out of five stars and wrote that "While he was still a successful attraction, this album wouldn't reach the multi-platinum levels of its predecessors." also noting that "Ocean's voice also lacked the resonance and authority it had on earlier dance tunes and wasn't as convincing or confident on ballads."

Track listing

Personnel 
Credits are adapted from the album's liner notes.

Musicians

 Billy Ocean – vocals
 Dave Collard, Mitchel Forman, Rob Lord, Brenda Nicholas, Phil Nicholas, Eric Rehl and V. Jeffrey Smith – keyboards, synthesizers
 Pete Q. Harris and Phil Nicholas – Fairlight programming 
 Jonathan Butler, Steve Byrd, Mike Campbell and Ira Siegel – guitars
 Paul Bruce and Jolyon Skinner – bass
 Richard Bailey, Terry Silverlight and Buddy Williams – drums
 Charles Dougherty, Wesley Magoogan and Lenny Pickett – saxophones
 Clifton Anderson – trombone
 Mac Gollehon and Ron Tooley – trumpet
 Richard Hendrickson and Edith Wint – cello
 Phillip Ballou, Ethel Beatty, Mary Cassidy, Will Downing, Lani Groves, Yolanda Lee Lewis, the Manhattans, Cindy Mizelle, Brenda Nelson, Vaneese Thomas, Carroll Thompson, Bernita Turner and Andrey Wheeler – backing vocals

Production and artwork
 Producers – Robert John "Mutt" Lange (Tracks 1, 5 & 6); Barry J. Eastmond and Wayne Braithwaite (Tracks 2, 3, 4 & 7-10).
 Recording Engineers – Jerry Peal and Steve Power; assisted by Bruce Robbins and Chris Trevitt
 Mixing – Nigel Green (Tracks 1-7 & 10); Bryan "Chuck" New (Tracks 8 & 9).
 Sleeve Design – Zombart (Jonathan Elliot and Ben Wilson).
 Additional Design and Layout – Jim @ Wolf Graphics
 Photography – Iain McKell
 Liner Notes – Michael Silvester

Chart performance

Sales and certifications

References

External links

1988 albums
Billy Ocean albums
Albums produced by Robert John "Mutt" Lange
Albums produced by Teddy Riley
Jive Records albums
Albums recorded at Morgan Sound Studios